Kələxana (also Kelakhan, Kelakhana, and Kelakhany) was a village and municipality in the Shamakhi District of Azerbaijan. The village had an Armenian population before the exodus of Armenians from Azerbaijan after the outbreak of the Nagorno-Karabakh conflict. In 1999, the village was administratively merged with a neighbourhood from the city of Shamakhi to create the Şəhriyar village.

References

External links 

Populated places in Shamakhi District